

About
The American Association of Clinical Anatomists (AACA) aims to advance the science and art of clinical anatomy. It encourages research and publication in the field and maintains high standards in the teaching of anatomy. Clinical anatomy is defined as anatomy in all its aspects - gross, histologic, developmental and neurologic as applied to clinical practice, the application of anatomic principles to the solution of clinical problems and/or the application of clinical observations to expand anatomic knowledge.

The AACA is a member of the International Federation of Associations of Anatomists (IFAA).  The AACA's official journal, Clinical Anatomy, is also the official journal of the British Association of Clinical Anatomists.  It publishes original and review articles of scientific, clinical, and educational interest to anatomists and clinicians.

Typical membership, regular or associate (student/intern) in the Association comprises individuals from various backgrounds
who have produced a record of research, clinical practice, clinical research, teaching in accredited colleges and universities,
administrative or other experience in the field.  Many of the primary educators of medical students in their first year of medical school are AACA members.  The current president of the AACA is Marios Loukas, MD, PhD.

Committees
 Anatomical Services Committee
 Bylaws Committee
 Career Development Committee
 Clinical Anatomical Terminology Committee
 Educational Affairs Committee
 Financial Affairs Committee
 Journal Committee
 Membership Committee
 Nominating Committee
 Program and Meeting Committees

Past Presidents

 2019-2021  Robert J. Spinner, M.D.
 2017-2019 Marios Loukas, M.D., Ph.D.
 2015-2017  Neil S. Norton, Ph.D.
 2013-2015  Brian R. MacPherson, Ph.D.
 2011-2013  Anne R. Agur, Ph.D.
 2009-2011  Todd R. Olson, Ph.D.
 2007-2009  Lawrence M. Ross, M.D., Ph.D.
 2005-2007  Thomas Quinn, Ph.D.
 2003-2005  Carol Scott-Conner, M.D., Ph.D.
 2001-2003  Daniel O. Graney, Ph.D.
 1999-2001  R. Benton Adkins, Jr., M.D.
 1997-1999  Arthur F. Dalley, II, Ph.D.
 1995-1997  Peter C. Amadio, M.D.
 1993-1995  Donald R. Cahill, Ph.D.
 1991-1993  Sandy C. Marks, Jr. D.D.S., Ph.D.
 1989-1991  Keith L. Moore, Ph.D.
 1987-1989  Robert A. Chase, M.D.
 1985-1987  Ralph Ger, M.D.
 1983-1985  Oliver H. Beahrs, M.D.

References

External links
 
 History
 Official Journal

Anatomists
International medical and health organizations
Medical associations based in the United States
Medical and health organizations based in Georgia (U.S. state)